Suzanne Lenglen defeated Joan Fry 6–2, 6–0 in the final to win the ladies' singles tennis title at the 1925 Wimbledon Championships.

Kitty McKane was the defending champion, but lost in the semifinals to Lenglen.

Draw

Finals

Top half

Section 1

Section 2

Bottom half

Section 3

Section 4

References

External links

Women's Singles
Wimbledon Championship by year – Women's singles
Wimbledon Championships - singles
Wimbledon Championships - singles